Phoenix, or Phenix, was an American wooden whaler, launched in 1821. She plied the Pacific Ocean from her homeport of Nantucket, Massachusetts. She made ten complete voyages between 1821 and her loss, on her 11th voyage, in 1858.

Phoenix and her captain, Perry Winslow, discovered Winslow Reef, northwest of Canton, in 1851. The entire group of Phoenix Islands in the South Pacific are named after a ship, which was active in the area in the 1820s, which may be this ship.

Phoenix was in the Galapagos in 1835 and 1836. On 10 January 1836 the crew was ashore and left graffiti carved into rocks there. While in the Galapagos islands the crew also gathered tortoises to eat, perhaps as many as 140.

Whaling voyages
Between 1821 and 1858, Phoenix made 11 whaling voyages:

Fate
Phoenix was lost on Elbow Island in the Sea of Okhotsk on 12 October 1858, about 100 miles from Ayan.

Citations and references

Citations

References
 
 
  (ASIN: B00EM34EM6)
 

Ships built in the United States
1821 ships
Whaling ships
Shipwrecks in the Sea of Okhotsk
Maritime incidents in October 1858